Vincent Shen (1949-2018) was a philosopher known for his work in Chinese philosophy and in the comparative dialogue between Western and Chinese thought.

Biography 
Born in Taiwan in 1949, Shen completed his undergraduate studies at Fu Jen Catholic University and his PhD at the University of Louvain (UCLouvain) in 1980 on the philosophies of Maurice Blondel and Alfred North Whitehead, before returning to Taiwan to teach philosophy at the National Chengchi University in Taipei for twenty years. He moved to Canada in 2000, where he held the Lee Chair in Chinese Thought and Culture at the University of Toronto, a post shared across the Departments of East Asian Studies and Philosophy, until his death in 2018.

Shen died on November 14, 2018, after suffering from a major stroke. He is survived by his wife, Joanna Liu, also a professor in the Department of East Asian Studies of the University of Toronto, a son and daughter, and grandchildren.

References

External links
Vincent Shen at the University of Toronto
Vincent Shen: Life and Thought

Philosophy academics
Academic staff of the University of Toronto
Philosophers of religion
2018 deaths
1949 births
Taiwanese philosophers
Philosophers of technology
Heidegger scholars
Philosophers of culture
Fu Jen Catholic University alumni
Université catholique de Louvain alumni